Wilson Macías (born 30 September 1965) is an Ecuadorian footballer. He played in 34 matches for the Ecuador national football team from 1987 to 1991. He was also part of Ecuador's squad for the 1987 Copa América tournament.

References

1965 births
Living people
Ecuadorian footballers
Ecuador international footballers
Place of birth missing (living people)
Association football midfielders